Yuriy Serhiyovych Kerman (born on 2 August 1955) is a Soviet and Ukrainian professional footballer and coach.

References

External links
 

1955 births
Living people
Soviet footballers
Ukrainian footballers
FC Lokomotiv Kaluga players
FC Dynamo Stavropol players
FC Mariupol players
SC Tavriya Simferopol players
SC Tavriya Simferopol managers
FC Mariupol managers
FC Illichivets-2 Mariupol managers
Ukrainian Premier League managers
Soviet football managers
Ukrainian football managers
Association football midfielders